Syromastus is a true bug genus in the family Coreidae.

Species
One living (extant) species is placed within this genus, Syromastus rhombeus .

Extinct species
 Syromastus affinis (Heer, 1853)
 Syromastus buchii (Heer, 1853)
 Syromastus coloratus (Heer, 1853)
 Syromastus punctiventris (Statz, 1950)
 Syromastus seyfriedi (Heer, 1853)

References

Coreini
Coreidae genera
Hemiptera of Europe